Béla Bartók's Violin Concerto No. 2, BB 117 was written in 1937–38. During the composer's life, it was known simply as his Violin Concerto. His other violin concerto, Violin Concerto No. 1, Sz. 36, BB 48a, was written in the years 1907–1908, but only published in 1956, after the composer's death, as "Violin Concerto No. 1, Op. posth."

Bartók composed the concerto in a difficult stage of his life, when he was filled with serious concerns about the growing strength of fascism. He was of firm anti-fascist opinions, and therefore became the target of various attacks in pre-war Hungary.

Bartók initially planned to write a single-movement concerto set of variations, but Zoltán Székely wanted a standard three-movement concerto.  In the end, Székely received his three movements, while Bartók received his variations: the second movement is a formal set of variations, and the third movement is a variation on material from the first.

Though the piece does not employ twelve-tone technique, it contains twelve-tone themes, such as in the first and third movements:

The work was premiered at the Concertgebouw, Amsterdam on March 23, 1939 with Zoltán Székely on violin and Willem Mengelberg conducting the Concertgebouw Orchestra.

It had its United States premiere in Cleveland, Ohio in 1943, with Tossy Spivakovsky on the violin accompanied by The Cleveland Orchestra conducted by Artur Rodziński. Spivakovsky later gave the New York and San Francisco premieres of the work.

Structure 
It has the following three movements:

The concerto is scored for 2 flutes (2nd doubling piccolo), 2 oboes (2nd doubling English horn), 2 clarinets (2nd doubling bass clarinet), 2 bassoons (2nd doubling contrabassoon), 4 horns, 2 trumpets, 3 trombones, timpani, side drum, bass drum, cymbals, triangle, tamtam (gong), celesta, harp, and strings.

Footnotes

Further reading
 Somfai, László. 1977. "Strategics of Variation in the Second Movement of Bartók's Violin Concerto 1937–1938". Studia Musicologica Academiae Scientiarum Hungaricae 19, Fasc. 1/4:161–202.
Ujfalussy, József. 1971. "Is Bartók's Concerto for Violin Really His Second?" Studia Musicologica Academiae Scientiarum Hungaricae 13, Fasc. 1/4:355–56.

External links 
 

Bartok 02
Concertos by Béla Bartók
1938 compositions